Nikolaus Szapáry (born 30 May 1959) is an Austrian sports shooter. He competed at the 1980 Summer Olympics and the 1984 Summer Olympics.

References

1959 births
Living people
Austrian male sport shooters
Olympic shooters of Austria
Shooters at the 1980 Summer Olympics
Shooters at the 1984 Summer Olympics
Sportspeople from Vienna
20th-century Austrian people